Governor Pierce may refer to:

Benjamin Pierce (governor) (1757–1839), 11th Governor of New Hampshire
Gilbert A. Pierce (1839–1901), 8th Governor of Dakota Territory
Walter M. Pierce (1861–1954), 17th Governor of Oregon

See also
Governor Pearce (disambiguation)